Revelle may refer to:

13358 Revelle (1998 TA34) is a Main-belt Asteroid
Revelle College, the first college founded at the University of California, San Diego
Roger Revelle (1909–1991), scientist and scholar after whom Revelle College is named
USNS Roger Revelle (T-AGOR-24), research vessel operated by Scripps Institution of Oceanography
William Revelle, psychology professor at Northwestern University
Douglas ReVelle (1964–2010), scientist who worked in meteoritic sciences

See also
Revelles, commune in the Somme département in the Picardie region of France